This is a list of Cornish musicians or other musicians resident in Cornwall, England, United Kingdom.

Composers and classical musicians

 Kevin Ackford, Brass Band composer and arranger, conductor and Tutor
 Malcolm Arnold, composer 
 William Beale, composer and singer
 Dame Alida Brittain, harpist
 Philip Cannon, composer
 Cornelius Cardew, composer 
 Ralph Dunstan, composer and musicologist
 Alfred John Ellory, leading British flautist who played on the Beatles song "The Fool on the Hill"
 Janet Elston
 Joseph Antonio Emidy, violinist and composer 
 Giles Farnaby, composer (alleged)
 Graham Fitkin, composer
 Derek Holman, composer, conductor and choirmaster
 Charles Benjamin Incledon, singer
 Richard Jose, singer
 Gerald Hocken Knight, cathedral organist
 George Lloyd, composer
 Benjamin Luxon, singer
 Moura Lympany, pianist
 Richard John Maddern-Williams, composer and organist 
 Thomas Merritt, composer
 Alan Opie, singer
 William Paull, baritone singer
 Kenneth Pelmear, composer of "Hail to the Homeland"
 Elizabeth Philp, singer, music educator and composer
 Goff Richards, brass band arranger and composer
 Ben Salfield, lutenist, composer and editor
 Dudley Savage, organist
 Edmund Sedding, architect and musician; resident at Penzance
 George Thalben-Ball, organist
 Michael Tippett, composer
 Thomas Tomkins, composer
 Stephen Varcoe, singer
 David Willcocks, choral conductor, organist, and composer; born at Newquay

Popular musicians

 Tori Amos, American singer-songwriter; has a home and studio near Bude
 Hilary Coleman, of Dalla and Cumpas Ltd.
Phyllis Doherty, folk singer, First World War commandant of Women's Volunteer Motor Corps
 Kevin Downing, drummer for 1990s indie band The Family Cat
 Louis Eliot, singer-songwriter
 Fisherman's Friends, a cappella group
 Mick Fleetwood, drummer in rock band Fleetwood Mac
 Bruce Foxton, bass player in punk rock band The Jam
 Jon Fugler, electronic musician
 Al Hodge (1951–2006), rock musician and songwriter
 Richard D. James (a.k.a. "Aphex Twin"), electronic music artist
 Andy Mackay, musician and founder member of art rock band Roxy Music
 Ralph McTell, singer-songwriter
 Tim McVay, guitarist in indie band The Family Cat
 Tom Middleton, electronic musician
 James Morrison, singer-songwriter
 Alex Parks, singer-songwriter
 Tim Rice, lyricist
 Goff Richards, brass band arranger and composer
 Andrew Ridgeley, guitarist and singer in music duo Wham!
 Roger Taylor, drummer in rock band Queen
 Sheila Tracy, trombone player and broadcaster
 Luke Vibert, electronic music artist
 Veryan Weston, jazz and rock pianist
 Keren Woodward, singer-songwriter and composer in female pop band Bananarama
 Brenda Wootton (1928–1994), Cornish bard and singer

See also

 List of people from Cornwall
 Music of Cornwall

References

 
Musicians
Musicians
Cornish